An urtext edition of a work of classical music is a printed version intended to reproduce the original intention of the composer as exactly as possible, without any added or changed material. Other kinds of editions distinct from urtext are facsimile and interpretive editions, discussed below.

Preparing urtext editions 

The sources for an urtext edition include the autograph (that is, the manuscript produced in the composer's hand), hand copies made by the composer's students and assistants, the first published edition, and other early editions.  Since first editions often include misprints, a particularly valuable source for urtext editions is a copy of the first edition that was hand-corrected by the composer.

Typically, an urtext edition will include a preface indicating what sources were consulted by the editor.  In the case of manuscripts, or first editions that have become rare, the editor will indicate the scholarly library or other repository in which they are kept.

Where the sources are few, or misprint-ridden, or conflicting, the task of the urtext editor becomes difficult. Cases where the composer had bad penmanship (for example, Beethoven), or revised the work after publication, likewise create difficulties.

A fundamental problem in urtext editing is how to present variant readings. If the editor includes too few variants, this restricts the freedom of the performer to choose. Yet including unlikely variants from patently unreliable sources likewise serves the performer badly. Where the editor must go farthest out on a limb is in identifying misprints or scribal errors. The great danger—not at all hypothetical—is that an eccentric or even inspired choice on the composer's part will be obliterated by an overzealous editor.

One other source of difficulty arises from the fact that works of music usually involve passages that are repeated (either identically or similarly) in more than one location; this occurs, for instance, in the recapitulation section of a work in sonata form or in the main theme of a rondo.  Often the dynamic markings or other marks of expression found in one location in the source material are missing in analogous locations.  The strictest possible practice is to render all markings literally, but an urtext editor may also want to point out the markings found in parallel passages.

One common response of editors for all of these difficulties is to provide written documentation of the decisions that were made, either in footnotes or in a separate section of commentary.

Types of editions

Facsimile editions

Urtext editions differ from facsimile editions, which simply present a photographic reproduction of one of the original sources for a work of music.  The urtext edition adds value to what the performer could get from a facsimile by integrating evidence from multiple sources and exercising informed scholarly judgment.  Urtext editions are also easier to read than facsimiles.  Thus, facsimile editions are intended mostly for use by scholars, along with performers who pursue scholarship as part of their preparation.

The musicologist James Webster, basing his remarks on his study of two leading urtext editions of Haydn's E flat Piano Sonata, H. XVI:49, suggests that players interested in historically informed performance ought to play from a facsimile. The reason is that some markings made by the composer simply cannot be rendered faithfully in a printed edition.  For Haydn, these include marks that are intermediate in length between a dot and a stroke (which evidently have different meanings for this composer), or phrase arcs that end high above the notes, leaving it ambiguous where a phrase begins or ends.  In such cases, printed editions are forced to make a choice; only a facsimile can provide an unaltered expression of the composer's intent.

Interpretive editions

Urtext editions also differ from interpretive editions, which offer the editor's personal opinion on how to perform the work.  This is indicated by providing markings for dynamics and other forms of musical expression, which supplement or replace those of the composer.  In extreme cases, interpretive editions have deliberately altered the composer's notes or even deleted entire passages.
In the 19th and early 20th centuries, many famous performing musicians provided interpretive editions, including Harold Bauer, Artur Schnabel, and Ignacy Paderewski.  In the days before recorded music, such editions were often the only way that students could obtain inspiration from the performing practice of leading artists, and even today they retain value for this purpose.

A compromise between urtext and interpretive editing is an edition in which the editor's additions are typographically distinguished (usually with parentheses, size, greyscale or detailed in accompanying prose) from the composer's own markings.  Such compromise editions are particularly useful for early music, where the interpretation of the musical notation of long ago often poses difficulties.

Authenticity

Webster has suggested that many editions that are labeled "Urtext" do not really qualify:

{{quote|The great majority of editions labelled 'Urtext' make many more changes than their editors admit.  Publishers are partly to blame; they are afraid of doing anything that might seem unfamiliar or off-putting to any potential market.  Indeed they want to have the best of both worlds; for example, the Neue Mozart Ausgabe claims to offer 'an unexceptionable text from the scholarly viewpoint, which at the same time takes the needs of musical practice into account.'  Whether this is a pious hope or frankly based on self-interest, the fact remains that one can't serve two masters.}}

Editions currently used

William S. Newman suggests that in contemporary music teaching, urtext editions have become increasingly favored, though he expresses some ambivalence about this development:

The Bülow-Lebert edition to which Newman refers is a well-known interpretive edition of the sonatas.

See also

Scholarly method
Historical editions (music)

 References 
 

 Sources 
Grier, James (1996) The Critical Editing of Music: History, Method, and Practice. Cambridge: Cambridge University Press, 1996. .
Newman, William S. (1986) The pianist's problems: a modern approach to efficient practice and musicianly performance.  Da Capo Press.
Webster, James (1997) "The triumph of variability:  Haydn's articulation markings in the autograph of Sonata No. 49 in E flat", in Sieghard Brandenburg, ed., Haydn, Mozart, & Beethoven:  Studies in the Music of the Classical Period. Essays in Honour of Alan Tyson''.  Oxford:  Clarendon Press.
The New Grove Dictionary of Music and Musicians (2001, New York:  Grove).  See the entries "Urtext" and "Editing".

External links
'Concerning the review of the Urtext edition of Beethoven's Ninth Symphony'. Jonathan Del Mar defends his Urtext edition of the Beethoven symphonies from a hostile review by David Levy; Levy then gives his reply. Both scholars invoke their personal scholarly values concerning Urtext editions.
Comments on urtext editions from the G. Henle publishing house
 Comments on urtext editing by Patrice Connelly
"The 4 types of music editions." Blog entry by Gerald Klickstein.  Compares the same work in facsimile, urtext, and interpretive editions.
Comments on fingerings added to urtext editions by Jura Margulis

Web sites of publishers who issue urtext editions:
G.Henle Verlag edition
Wiener edition

Music publishing
Textual scholarship